John W. Holtzman (April 23, 1858 Berks County, Pennsylvania – March 6, 1942) was the 20th mayor of the city of Indianapolis, Indiana. Holtzman first came to Indianapolis in 1883 to read law. He was admitted to the bar in 1885. Holtzman, a Democrat, first ran for mayor in 1903 when he defeated Republican incumbent Charles A. Bookwalter. During the 1905 campaign, the two political rivals met again but Bookwalter prevailed and obtained a second term.

References

External links

 

1858 births
1942 deaths
Mayors of Indianapolis
Indiana Democrats
20th-century American politicians
American lawyers admitted to the practice of law by reading law